Grin and Bear It is a comic strip panel published since 1932.

Grin and Bear It may also refer to:

 Grin and Bear It (Ugly Betty), a 2007 episode of the television series Ugly Betty
 Grin and Bear It (film), a 1954 Disney animated short film starring Donald Duck
 Grin and Bear It (album), a 1992 album by Impellitteri
 Grin & Bear It, a 1980 album by The Ruts